Muscatine may refer to:

People
 Charles Muscatine, scholar of medieval literature
 Lissa Muscatine

Places
 Muscatine County, Iowa
 Muscatine, Iowa (County Seat)
 Muscatine, Iowa micropolitan area

Other
 Louisa–Muscatine Community School District, covering rural portions of both Louisa and Muscatine counties in Iowa
 Muscatine Community College
 Muscatine Community School District
 Muscatine High School
 Muscatine Journal, a newspaper based in Muscatine, Iowa
 USS Muscatine